China National Highway 581 runs between Kashgar and Erkeshtam on the border with Kyrgyzstan. It is also known as the Sary-Tash-Ulugqat road and it was part of Asian Highway 65, superseded by the G3013 Artux–Erkeshtam Expressway.

See also
 China National Highways

References

Transport in Xinjiang